The Cozy Mark IV is a 4-seat, single engine, homebuilt light aircraft designed by Nat Puffer, with parts and plans supplied by Aircraft Spruce & Specialty Co. The aircraft is built from plans using basic raw materials. It is not a kit aircraft, though many small parts are available prefabricated. The Cozy is similar in design and construction to the 2-seat Rutan Long-EZ, from which it is derived, with approval from Burt Rutan.

The Cozy Mark IV utilizes foam and fiberglass sandwich construction, with foam suited to the usage, fiberglass oriented for the stresses, and epoxy to bond them together.

Nat Puffer designed the aircraft as a high speed cross-country visual flight rules (VFR) aircraft, although many builders equip their planes with instrument flight rules (IFR) capabilities.

Design and development
The aircraft is constructed primarily of fiberglass, foam, and epoxy. Urethane foam is used to form highly curved, hand-carved shapes such as the nose and wing tips. Blue rigid styrofoam is cut with a hot wire saw to form the wing cores. Thin PVC foam sheets are used to form bulkheads and the fuselage sides. Two types of woven fiberglass are used to provide the surface strength of the composite sandwich. RA7715 fiberglass is almost entirely unidirectional in its fiber orientation. RA7725 has an equal portion of perpendicular fiberglass strands. Epoxy systems used include EZ-Poxy, Safe-T-Poxy, MGS L285 and L335, and West Systems. The builder does not need pre-fabricated items to finish the aircraft except for the landing gear bow and nose gear strut which require forms and an oven for post curing, but several suppliers exist for these parts.

The recommended engine is the  Lycoming O-360, but a variety of powerplants from  have been used. One installation uses two Suzuki 1600 automobile engines driving two concentric contrarotating propellers.

Previous versions and related aircraft

Cozy
Like the Long-EZ, the design includes a retractable nose gear and fixed main gear. With both front seats unoccupied, the center of gravity with the aircraft level is aft of the main gear. Thus, like the Long-EZ, the Cozy is parked with the nose resting on the ground, sometimes called "grazing". The nose-down position is very stable. The aircraft can withstand high winds as the wings are beyond a flying angle of attack. Some Cozy builders modify the design to include retractable main gear. This modification increases the maximum speed by a few knots. Maximum fuel tank capacity is reduced to accommodate the retracted gear.

Cozy III
The Cozy III was a 3-seat aircraft and the predecessor of the 4-seat Cozy Mark IV. Also designed by Nat Puffer, the Cozy III was initially referred to as simply "The Cozy". When the 4-place was announced, the qualification of the Cozy IV name was required.

Cosy Classic
The Cosy Classic is the European version of Cozy III, changed to a forward opening canopy and other modifications. The forward opening canopy design is available from Uli Wolter, the designer of the Cosy Classic modifications.

Aeromet Aura
UAV, realized on the basis of a Cozy MK IV in 1986. Built in duplicate by the American company Aeromet Inc.for the US Army.

Specifications (Cozy MK IV)

See also
Berkut 360
Canard
Cozy III
Glassic SQ2000
Pusher configuration
Raptor Aircraft Raptor
Rutan Defiant
Rutan Long-EZ
Rutan VariEze
Steve Wright Stagger-Ez
Velocity SE
Velocity XL

References

External links

Canard aircraft
Single-engined pusher aircraft
Aircraft first flown in 1993
Mid-wing aircraft
1990s United States sport aircraft